Roberto Bonnano (16 March 1938 – 22 January 2012) was an Argentine former footballer who competed in the 1960 Summer Olympics.

References

1938 births
2012 deaths
Association football forwards
Argentine footballers
Olympic footballers of Argentina
Footballers at the 1960 Summer Olympics
Club Atlético Vélez Sarsfield footballers
Pan American Games medalists in football
Pan American Games gold medalists for Argentina
Footballers at the 1959 Pan American Games
Medalists at the 1959 Pan American Games